Puerto Rico Highway 212 (PR-212)  is a north–south bypass located south of downtown Isabela, Puerto Rico. This road extends from the junction of PR-2 with PR-4494 to PR-4472, near PR-112, and is known as Carretera Santiago Polanco Abreu.

Major intersections

See also

 List of highways numbered 212

References

External links
 

212
Isabela, Puerto Rico